Prosperous Nepal, Happy Nepali ("Samriddha Nepal, Sukhi Nepali") is the motto put forward by Nepali Prime minister KP Sharma Oli in his second premiership. The National Planning Commission has published 55 index for meeting the motto till financial year 2080/81.

The objectives of the motto includes:

 High and equitable national income ( उच्च र समतामूलक राष्ट्रिय आय )
 Human capital formation and full utilization of potential ( मानव पुँजी निर्माण तथा सम्भावनाको पूर्ण उपयोग )
 Accessible and modern infrastructure and intensive interconnection ( सर्वसुलभ तथा आधुनिक पूर्वाधार र सघन अन्तरआबद्धता )
 High and sustainable production and productivity ( उच्च र दिगो उत्पादन तथा उत्पादकत्व )
 Sophisticated and dignified life ( परिष्कृत तथा मर्यादित जीवन )
 Civilized and just society ( सभ्य र न्यायपूर्ण समाज )
 Healthy and balanced ecosystem ( स्वस्थ र सन्तुलित पर्यावरणीय पद्धति )
 Good governance ( सुशासन )
 Rule of law ( कानुनी शासन )

References

Government of Nepal